Protosilvius is a genus of flies in the family Tabanidae.

Species
Protosilvius gurupi Rafael, Marques & Limeira-de-Oliveira, 2012
Protosilvius inopinatus Zeegers, 2015
Protosilvius longipalpis (Macquart, 1848)
Protosilvius mackerrasi Fairchild, 1962
Protosilvius phoeniculus Fairchild, 1962
Protosilvius priscus Fairchild, 1962
Protosilvius termitiformis Enderlein, 1922

References

Tabanidae
Brachycera genera
Diptera of Africa
Diptera of South America
Taxa named by Günther Enderlein